Philemon B. Simpson (October 13, 1819 – April 28, 1895) was an American lawyer and politician.

Born in Ashtabula County, Ohio, Simpson was raised in Jefferson County, New York. He graduated from the University of Cincinnati College of Law in 1843 and was admitted to the Ohio Bar. He then practiced law in Peru, Indiana. In 1847, he moved to Shullburg, Wisconsin Territory and practiced law. He served in various city, village, and town government offices. In 1853, Simpson served in the Wisconsin State Assembly, as a Democrat, and then from 1857 to  1860, he then served in the Wisconsin State Senate. He died in Mobile, Alabama while his wife was recuperating from illness.

Notes

1819 births
1895 deaths
People from Ashtabula County, Ohio
People from Jefferson County, New York
People from Peru, Indiana
People from Shullsburg, Wisconsin
University of Cincinnati College of Law alumni
Indiana lawyers
Ohio lawyers
Wisconsin lawyers
Democratic Party Wisconsin state senators
19th-century American politicians
19th-century American lawyers
Democratic Party members of the Wisconsin State Assembly